Julius Kán may refer to:
 Julius I Kán (d. 1237)
 Julius II Kán (d. after 1234)
 Julius III Kán (d. after 1294)